Samuel Emmanuel Essende Mbongu (born 30 January 1998) is a French professional footballer who plays as a forward for  club Caen.

Career
Essende joined the Paris Saint-Germain Academy at the age of 12, and spent his entire youth footballing career with them. On 10 August 2018, he signed his first professional contract with PSG, keeping him with the club until 1 June 2021.

On 22 August 2018, Essende signed on loan with Eupen in Belgium. He made his professional debut with Eupen in a 1-0 Belgian First Division A win over Mouscron on 25 August 2018.

In August 2019, Essende signed for Championnat National side Avranches.

In 2021, Essende joined Ligue 2 side Pau.

On 20 June 2022, Essende signed a contract with Caen until 2025.

Personal life
Born in France, Essende is of Congolese descent.

Career statistics

Club

References

External links
 

1998 births
Living people
People from Montfermeil
French footballers
French sportspeople of Democratic Republic of the Congo descent
Championnat National players
Championnat National 2 players
Championnat National 3 players
Belgian Pro League players
Paris Saint-Germain F.C. players
K.A.S. Eupen players
US Avranches players
Pau FC players
Stade Malherbe Caen players
French expatriate footballers
French expatriate sportspeople in Belgium
Expatriate footballers in Belgium
Association football forwards
Footballers from Seine-Saint-Denis
Black French sportspeople